Indonesia competes at the 2015 Summer Universiade in Gwangju, South Korea.

Medal by sports

Medalists

References
 Country overview: Indonesia on the official website

External links

2015 in Indonesian sport
Nations at the 2015 Summer Universiade
Indonesia at the Summer Universiade